Little is known about Toqtaqiya except that he was a son of Urus Khan and was Khan of the White Horde for less than a year. In this time, he defeated his cousin Toqtamish and drove him from Sabran. He died shortly after this victory, just a few months after Urus.

Genealogy
Genghis Khan
Jochi
Orda Khan
Sartaqtay
Köchü
Bayan
Sasibuqa
Ilbasan
Chimtay
Urus
Toqtaqiya

See also
List of Khans of the Golden Horde

1377 deaths
14th-century monarchs in Asia
Year of birth unknown
Borjigin
Khans of the White Horde